Group A of the 2013 Fed Cup Americas Zone Group II was one of two pools in the Americas zone of the 2013 Fed Cup. Five teams competed in a round robin competition, with the teams proceeding to their respective sections of the play-offs: the top team played for advancement to the 2014 Group I.

Standings

Round-robin

Guatemala vs. Honduras

Ecuador vs. Bolivia

Guatemala vs. Puerto Rico

Bolivia vs. Honduras

Ecuador vs. Honduras

Puerto Rico vs. Bolivia

Guatemala vs. Bolivia

Ecuador vs. Puerto Rico

See also 
 Fed Cup structure

References

External links 
 Fed Cup website

2013 Fed Cup Americas Zone